Visionary Integration Professionals, LLC (VIP), is headquartered in Folsom, California, with additional offices in Reston, Virginia. VIP was established as a single-employee company by CEO Jonna Ward on February 29, 1996, and now has approximately 700 staff members who provide consulting support to federal, state, and local government agencies, as well as various commercial sector industries. VIP has three core service offerings:  Management Consulting, Technology Integration, and Learning.

Recognition
The American Business Awards Best Overall Company Finalist, 2004
Meridian's Learning Management System Wins 2011 Best of Elearning! Award
2011 HP Software Emerging Partner of the Year Award

References

Consulting firms established in 1996
Information technology consulting firms of the United States